John A. Haggerty (June 26, 1841 – March 11, 1910) was an American businessman and politician.

Born in Blairstown, New Jersey, Haggerty was educated in the Blairstown schools. During the American Civil War, Haggerty served in the 3rd Wisconsin Volunteer Infantry Regiment. In 1866, Haggerty moved to Mount Sterling, Wisconsin. He was in the mercantile business and served as postmaster of Mount Sterling. He served as treasurer for the town of Utica, Crawford County, Wisconsin. Haggerty also served on the Crawford County Board of Supervisors and was chairman of the county board. He lived in Ferryville, Wisconsin. In 1901, Haggerty served in the Wisconsin State Assembly, where he was on the Dairy and Food Committee. He was a Republican. He died at his home in Ferryville, Wisconsin.

Notes

External links

1841 births
1910 deaths
People from Blairstown, New Jersey
People from Crawford County, Wisconsin
People of Wisconsin in the American Civil War
Businesspeople from Wisconsin
County supervisors in Wisconsin
City and town treasurers in the United States
19th-century American politicians
People from Mount Sterling, Wisconsin
People from Utica, Crawford County, Wisconsin
19th-century American businesspeople
20th-century American politicians
Republican Party members of the Wisconsin State Assembly